Lovely and Amazing is a 2001 American comedy-drama film written and directed by Nicole Holofcener.

Plot
The story focuses on Jane Marks, her adult daughters Michelle and Elizabeth, and her pre-teen adopted African American daughter Annie, each of whom allows her personal insecurities to affect her life. Jane, longing to look younger and thinner, opts for liposuction, with near tragic results. When Michelle's artistic talents fail to produce any income for her family, much to the dismay of her husband Bill, she takes a job as a one-hour photo developer and finds herself falling for the attention of her teenaged co-worker Jordan. Aspiring actress Elizabeth, who bestows upon stray dogs the affection she finds difficult to offer her boyfriend Paul, questions her appeal when she's rejected for a role based on her looks, and she seeks reassurance from film heartthrob Kevin McCabe. Overweight Annie tries to fit in better with her white adopted family by having her hair straightened by black Big Sister volunteer Lorraine, who Jane hopes will put the young girl in touch with her heritage.

Сast

Production
The film debuted at the 2001 Telluride Film Festival. Prior to its initial limited release in New York City and Los Angeles, it was shown at the Los Angeles Film Festival, the Toronto International Film Festival, and the Tribeca Film Festival.

In its widest release, the film played on only 175 screens in the US. It grossed $4,210,379 domestically and $485,402 in foreign markets for a total worldwide box office of $4,695,781.

Critical reception

Lovely & Amazing received a "fresh" rating from Rotten Tomatoes, reporting that 86% of critics gave the a film positive review, based on 124 reviews. At Metacritic, which assigns a weighted average out of 100 to critics' reviews, the film received a score of 75 based on 31 reviews.

In his review in The New York Times, Stephen Holden said, "As smart and observant as it is, Lovely and Amazing doesn't really go anywhere. Ms. Holofcener's sharp, witty dialogue shows an ear acutely tuned to the edgy, competitive nuances of contemporary banter, and the movie expertly evokes the rivalry percolating just below the surface of the Markses' relationships. But once family members have weathered their personal crises, little seems to have changed."

Roger Ebert of the Chicago Sun-Times observed, "Here is a movie that knows its women, listens to them, doesn't give them a pass, allows them to be real: It's a rebuke to the shallow Ya-Ya Sisterhood."

In Variety, Todd McCarthy said, "Engaging, intermittently insightful but too glib to wring full value out of its subject matter, this brightly performed study of an extended family of females has enough going for it to quickly graduate from the fest circuit to a respectable career in specialized release . . . [it] evinces keen antenna for (mostly) female foibles, a good ear for dialogue, talent for directing thesps and a clean, unfussy visual style."

Mick LaSalle of the San Francisco Chronicle said, "Nicole Holofcener throws a bunch of issues on the table and takes time to linger over them, without worrying much about where her story's going or even if she has one. The result is a gutsy little picture and a nice slice of life."

In Rolling Stone, Peter Travers opined, "In this painfully funny and touching look at the vanities and insecurities that a mother can pass on to her daughters in the name of love, writer-director Nicole Holofcener does a chick flick right . . . Holofcener's film feels untidily honest. It's true to life, not to the Hollywood version."

Kenneth Turan of the Los Angeles Times said, "Like the best of personal, independent cinema . . . it is both marvelously observed and completely individual. There is no film like this film, and that is something you don't hear every day . . . it's so accurate about how people attempt meaningful emotional connections in an uncaring world of self-involvement, obtuseness and free-floating insecurity that it ought to be put in a time capsule."

Awards and nominations
Independent Spirit Award for Best Supporting Actress (Emily Mortimer, winner)
Independent Spirit Award for Best Film (nominee)
Independent Spirit Award for Best Director (nominee)
Independent Spirit Award for Best Screenplay (nominee)
Independent Spirit Award for Best Actress (Catherine Keener, nominee)
Independent Spirit Award for Best Debut Performance (Raven Goodwin, nominee)
Satellite Award for Best Original Screenplay (nominee)
Satellite Award for Best Actress - Motion Picture Musical or Comedy (Keener, nominee)
Satellite Award for Best Supporting Actress - Motion Picture (Mortimer, nominee)
Chicago Film Critics Association Award for Best Supporting Actress (Mortimer, nominee)
Black Reel Award for Best Breakthrough Performance (Goodwin, nominee)

See also
 List of American films of 2001

References

External links

2001 films
2001 comedy-drama films
American independent films
Lionsgate films
Films directed by Nicole Holofcener
American comedy-drama films
Films with screenplays by Nicole Holofcener
2001 comedy films
2001 drama films
2001 independent films
Films about mother–daughter relationships
Films about adoption
Films about parenting
2000s English-language films
2000s American films